Meadowlands Drive (Ottawa Road #51) is a suburban road in Ottawa, Ontario, Canada. It begins at Prince of Wales Drive as a continuation of Hog's Back Road in the neighborhood of Rideauview. There are two small shopping plazas and a Shell station at its corner with Prince of Wales. It then continues westward towards Fisher Avenue and consists of low-income housing projects, low-rise apartment buildings, townhouses and semi-detached homes.

Just east of its intersection with Merivale Road, there is a cluster of high-rise apartment buildings and two schools. The road then quickly widens to two lanes in each direction for its busy intersection with Merivale Road. This intersection is a major shopping area, consisting of four shopping plazas, one on each corner, and includes many stores, including Home Outfitters, Winners, and Staples. There are also several restaurants here, including Wendy's, Tim Hortons, Swiss Chalet and Mr. Sub.

West of Merivale Road, the road quickly reverts to 2 lanes in each direction at 40 km/h and is residential with the exception of a public school, a Montessori school and St Maurice Catholic Church. It ends at Woodroffe Avenue and becomes Tallwood Drive west of Woodroffe.

Due to the order in which the neighbourhoods along Meadowlands Drive were built, the numbering is not consistent. Addresses up to 178 are in the section west of Merivale Road (intermittently signed Meadowlands Dr. W.), while addresses from 888 up are east of Merivale Road, beginning at Prince of Wales Drive.

Many university and college students live along Meadowlands Drive during the school year because of its proximity and bus links to Algonquin College and Carleton University.

Bus routes
Meadowlands Drive is well served by OC Transpo bus service as follows:
 Route 86 travels between Fisher Avenue and Woodroffe Avenue.
 Route 111 travels between Prince of Wales Drive and Chesterton Drive, and again between Viewmount Drive and Woodroffe Avenue.
 Route 186 travels between Merivale Road and Woodroffe Avenue during peak hours Monday-Friday only.

Neighbourhoods
Meadowlands Drive generally passes through the following neighbourhoods.
 Rideau View
 Carleton Heights
 Fisher Heights
 Parkwood Hills
 Borden Farm

Major Intersections

The following is a list of major intersections along Meadowlands Drive, from east to west:

 Prince of Wales Drive
 Fisher Avenue
 Deer Park Drive
 Chesterton Drive
 Merivale Road
 Viewmount Drive
 Woodroffe Avenue

Roads in Ottawa